Blade is a surname. Notable people with the surname include:

Brady Blade (born 1965), American drummer, record producer, and composer
Brian Blade (born 1970), American drummer, composer, and singer-songwriter
Caolin Blade (born 1994), Irish rugby player 
Mary Blade (1913-1994), American engineer
Richard Blade (born 1952), British-American radio, television, and film personality
Stanford Blade, Canadian agronomist and academic administrator